Pietro Dell'Oro (born 11 November 1899, date of death unknown) was an Italian boxer who competed in the 1920 Summer Olympics. In 1920, he was eliminated in the first round of the flyweight class after losing his fight to Charles Albert.

References

External links
Pietro Dell'Oro profile

1899 births
Year of death missing
Flyweight boxers
Olympic boxers of Italy
Boxers at the 1920 Summer Olympics
20th-century deaths
Italian male boxers